Leonard Ashurst (10 March 1939 – 25 September 2021) was an English football player, manager and administrator.

He spent most of his playing career with Sunderland, making 458 appearances, the second most in the club's history. He retired at Hartlepool, where he began managing. Ashurst also managed Sunderland, won the Welsh Cup with Newport County in 1980, and had two spells at Cardiff City.

Ashurst was inducted into the League Managers Association Hall of Fame in 2014. After his managerial career, he was an administrator at The Football Association and a match delegate for the Premier League.

Playing career

Early career
Leonard Ashurst was born on 10 March 1939 in Fazakerley, Liverpool, to parents Elsie and Joseph. Initially a centre-half, he was moved to left-back by Liverpool Schoolboys as the team were short on naturally left-footed players, and helped the side to win the English Schools Trophy with an 8–1 aggregate win over Southampton Schoolboys. He was signed to the ground staff at Liverpool in 1954. He also worked as an apprentice compositor in the printing trade. He won seven caps for the England youth team in the 1956–57 season. Despite this international recognition he was not offered a professional contract by Liverpool manager Phil Taylor, and instead joined Wolverhampton Wanderers on amateur terms. Whilst playing third team football for Wolves, Ashurst was approached by Sunderland coach George Curtis, who promised him a professional contract at the club. In order to gain release from Wolves, Ashurst told manager Stan Cullis he wanted to leave professional football to continue his printing apprenticeship and to play for local Lancashire Combination team Prescot Cables; Cullis agreed, and Ashurst subsequently moved from Prescot Cables to Sunderland.

Sunderland
Ashurst signed professional forms at Sunderland on 27 December 1957, and made his debut for the reserve team the following day. Manager Alan Brown handed him his first team debut on 20 September 1958, in a 2–0 defeat to Ipswich Town at Roker Park; Jim McNab and Cecil Irwin also made their senior debuts in the match. Brown was in the process of dismantling the team that had been relegated the previous season, and Ashurst went on to feature in a total of 33 Second Division matches across the 1958–59 campaign. He was called up to the England under-23 team on 15 March 1961, in a 4–1 victory over Germany at White Hart Lane.

Following the abolition of the maximum wage in January 1961, Ashurst signed a new contract at £40-per-week the following summer. He went on to make 458 appearances for the club; putting him second in the all time appearances list in Sunderland's history, and one of only two outfield players to top 400 appearances. He scored four Sunderland goals during his time at the club. In the late sixties, alongside Jimmy Montgomery, Cecil Irwin, Martin Harvey, Charlie Hurley and Jim McNab, Ashurst formed one of the most notable and most settled back fives in Sunderland's history.

Hartlepool
After receiving a testimonial match against Newcastle United, Ashurst was given a free-transfer to Hartlepool where he became a player-manager. He ended his playing career in the 1972–73 season while at Hartlepool, and subsequently remained manager until May 1974 when he was appointed manager of Gillingham.

Managerial career
Ashurst managed Gillingham, Sheffield Wednesday, Newport County and Cardiff City before returning to Sunderland as manager in March 1984.

Ashurst was appointed manager of Newport County in 1978 following the departure of Colin Addison to West Bromwich Albion. Ashurst was manager from 1978 to 1982, the most successful period in the club's history. Newport were promoted to the Third Division in the 1979–80 season and won the Welsh Cup, entitling them to play in the 1980–81 season European Cup Winners' Cup, reaching the quarter finals. Ashurst was sacked by Newport County in February 1982 and Addison returned as team manager. The team, largely assembled by Ashurst, attained Newport County's highest post-war finish in the 1982–83 season, 4th in the Third Division, narrowly missing out on promotion.

His time as Sunderland manager was not successful, despite his taking them to their first ever League Cup final. Performance in the league was poor and Sunderland were relegated from the first division. Ashurst was sacked in May 1985.

After the Sunderland job, Ashurst went on to become a coach with Kuwait national football team and later the Qatar national football team. He was manager of Qatari club Al-Wakrah and also coached in Malaysia.

After returning to England, he was assistant manager of Blackpool, and then in September 1989 he returned for a second spell as manager of Cardiff City following the departure of Frank Burrows. He spent two years in Ninian Park before resigning in 1991 as the team struggled both on and off the pitch. His last managerial role was a one-year stay at Weymouth.

Football administration career
From the mid-1990s, Ashurst became heavily involved in an administrator's role at the Football Association specifically with regard to the Academy system. In 2002, he became a Premier League match delegate, and was tasked with assessing match officials. He was inducted into the League Managers' Association Hall of Fame in 2014.

Personal life
Ashurst married Valerie in her home village of East Rainton in May 1961.

He died on 25 September 2021, at the age of 82.

Career statistics

Managerial statistics

Honours
Sunderland
Football League Second Division runner-up (promotion): 1963–64

Newport County
Football League Fourth Division third-place (promotion): 1979–80
Welsh Cup winner: 1980

Cardiff City
Football League Third Division runner-up (promotion): 1982–83

References
General
 

Specific

1939 births
2021 deaths
Footballers from Liverpool
English footballers
Association football defenders
England youth international footballers
England under-23 international footballers
Liverpool F.C. players
Wolverhampton Wanderers F.C. players
Prescot Cables F.C. players
Sunderland A.F.C. players
Hartlepool United F.C. players
English Football League players
Hartlepool United F.C. managers
Gillingham F.C. managers
Sheffield Wednesday F.C. managers
Newport County A.F.C. managers
Cardiff City F.C. managers
Sunderland A.F.C. managers
Expatriate football managers in Qatar
Al-Wakrah SC managers
Expatriate football managers in Malaysia
Weymouth F.C. managers
English football managers
Southern Football League managers
Blackpool F.C. non-playing staff
English autobiographers